Stuart D. McLaren (born c. 1902) was a rugby union player who represented Australia.

McLaren, a wing, was born in Sydney and claimed one international rugby cap for Australia.

References

Australian rugby union players
Australia international rugby union players
Rugby union players from Sydney
Rugby union wings